Erythrina falcata, commonly known as the Brazilian coral tree, is a timber tree native to Atlantic Forest vegetation in Brazil, Paraguay and Argentina. This plant is also used as a medicinal plant and ornamental plant which is attractive to birds.

See also

 List of plants of Atlantic Forest vegetation of Brazil

References
 Richter, H.G., and Dallwitz, M.J. 2000 onwards. Commercial timbers: descriptions, illustrations, identification, and information retrieval. In English, French, German, Portuguese, and Spanish.

External links
International Legume Database & Information Service: Erythrina falcata

falcata
Trees of Brazil
Trees of Argentina
Trees of Uruguay
Trees of Paraguay
Flora of the Atlantic Forest
Garden plants of South America
Ornamental trees
Taxa named by George Bentham